Matteson School District 162 is a suburban school district in Illinois, based in Richton Park. The district enrolls nearly 2,400 students, serving portions of Matteson, Richton Park, Olympia Fields, Park Forest and a small section of University Park.  it has 2,100 students.

The district is currently headquartered in Richton Park, it was previously headquartered in Matteson.

Schools

Middle School
 O.W. Huth Middle School (Matteson)

Elementary Schools
 Arcadia Elementary School (Olympia Fields)
 Illinois Elementary School (Park Forest)
 Indiana Elementary School (Park Forest)
 Richton Square School (Richton Park)
 Sauk Elementary School (Richton Park)
 Matteson Elementary School (Matteson)

Former schools:
 Illinois Primary Center (Park Forest)

See also
 Southland College Preparatory Charter High School - Charter school in the district boundaries but not operated by the district

References

Further reading
  - Profile at Education Resources Information Center (ERIC), EJ#EJ221636

External links

School districts in Cook County, Illinois